Stefan Paul Goetsch (born 1978), best known by the alias Hainbach, is a German experimental electronic music composer and video creator, based in Berlin. He has become known internationally for his Ambient recordings and experimental music techniques on his YouTube channel. Pitchfork magazine described Hainbach’s channel as "a treasure trove of clips with titles like How to Make Music With a Vintage Piano Tuner and Playing Live With Nuclear Instruments and Unknown Synths."

Biography 
Stefan Paul Goetsch was born in Freiburg im Breisgau, and grew up in Denzlingen at the edge of the Black Forest. He started playing piano at the age of six. As a teenager he was programming his own computer games and played bass in a school band. Goetsch studied in Hamburg and now lives in Berlin with his family. Together with Andre Frahm and Jan Elbeshausen, he played in the New Wave style band The Dance Inc. until they split up in 2009. The band released all of their songs on the Hamburg based label Audiolith Records.

Under his alias Hainbach he uses experimental music techniques with tape loops and nuclear test equipment. The British music magazine The Wire called his music "One hell of a trip".

Stefan Paul Goetsch started making music as Hainbach in 2010. Since then he has released albums on Opal Tapes, Lavender Sweep Records, Chase Bliss, Soil, Ultraviolet Light, Misc., Springbreak Tapes, SA Recordings, Gohan Tapes, Marionette, Seil Records and Alessandro Cortini’s Limited Interest label. The music websites Bandcamp Daily and The Quietus praised his 2018 album The Evening Hopefuls and named Hainbach as one of "Ten Musicians Updating Electroacoustic Music for the 21st Century".

As an inspiration he named Bela Bartok, 1980s video game scores, Francis Bebey and Karl-Heinz Stockhausen.

In May 2022, he joined with Cuckoo and Sam Battle of Look Mum No Computer to form a musical supergroup.

Scoring work 
Stefan Paul Goetsch worked on more than 70 theatre plays as a composer, lyricist and live musician. Amongst those are the Staatstheater Hannover, Schauspielhaus Hamburg, Theater Frankfurt, Theater Bonn and Deutsches Nationaltheater und Staatskapelle Weimar.

Hainbach wrote the music for Alexey Demidov's iOS game BrainConnect in 2016.

In 2017 he composed the score to the short-documentary Bruderkrieg (English title: War Of Brothers) by Felix Moser and Julian Moser. The two brothers have collaborated with Hainbach on several music videos including the visual album to Light Splitting, which premiered on Fact Magazine and was selected to Ars Electronica Festival in 2020. Hainbach scored the 2021 feature documentary Billions of Windows about the life of Stephen Wiltshire, directed by Sergey Stefanovich. He wrote the soundtrack for the 2021 feature documentary The One Who Runs Away Is the Ghost, directed by Qinyuan Lei. This is the second soundtrack collaboration with Moserfilm.

In April 2021 Hainbach created sounds for AVAR, an augmented reality app by the Estonian artist Taavi Varm, in collaboration with the Goethe Institut in Tallinn.

Live performances 
Hainbach performed at venues like Kantine am Berghain in Berlin, Uebel & Gefährlich in Hamburg, Blå in Oslo. Together with visual artist Nani Gutiérrez alias Orca, they have played festivals such as Die Digitale Düsseldorf and Up To Date Festival in Bialystok. His live performance concept Schlaufenzeit premiered at the 2021 Impuls Festival in Halle. It is based around German 1950s test equipment and a Hohner Electronium tube synthesizer.

Sound installations 
The sound installation Landfill Totems is a playable set of sound sculptures put together from obsolete medical and nuclear test equipment. It premiered at PDNT Gallery Berlin in November 2019 and was later shown at Patch Point in Berlin-Kreuzberg. The installation sound was also released as a full album and an accompanying sound library, with contributions by the composers KMRU and Eric D. Clark.
In October 2021 Hainbach’s installation Destruction Loops was presented at the Impuls Festival in Halle. The festival had been defamed and attacked by the AfD, CDU politicians and other right-wing groups for years. In a room-filling sound installation, collages of the worst comments, attacks and excerpts from the official AfD election program were slowly destroyed on self-destructing audio tape loops. The performance lasted 48 hours.

Virtual instruments and audio plug-ins 
Hainbach created several virtual instruments and audio plug-ins. Fundamental, his app in collaboration with sonicLAB is a sound synthesis plugin, based on the workflow of electronic studios of the past. The app Gauss Field Looper he designed with Bram Bos is based on his approach to looping live.

In 2020 Hainbach teamed up with plugin creators AudioThing to release Wires, a Soviet wire recorder used by the East German military turned into a plugin. Things – Motor is a morphing rotor effect inspired by The Crystal Palace from the BBC Radiophonic workshop. The original sound by Brian Hodgson and Delia Derbyshire can be heard on the soundtrack to the Doctor Who episode The Krotons.
Landfill Totems, a virtual instrument in collaboration with Spitfire Audio, was made of high-end medical, telecommunication and scientific research equipment.

Discography

Albums 

 As Sparks Fly Upward (2012)
 The Heat (2014) 
 Ashes (2015) 
 Shrines (2016)
 No Need For Rain (2017)
 Cello Pattern (2017)
 Violin Forms (2017)
 The Evening Hopefuls (2018)
 Codex (2018)
 Songs For Coco (2018)
 Ambient Piano Works (2018)
 Senses (2018) 
 Old Suns (2019)
 Gestures (2019)
 Assertion (2020)
 Light Splitting (2020)
 Schwebungssummer (2021)
 Landfill Totems (2021)
 Home Stories (2021)

Soundtrack albums 

 Bruderkrieg (2017)
 Billions Of Windows (2021)
 The One Who Runs Away Is the Ghost (tba)

Extended plays 

 A Ritual (2014)
 Rhein (2016)
 Only The Rain Never Tires (2017)
 Dear Earth (2018)
 Impulsgenerator (2019)
 The Earth’s Own Sighs (2020)
 Gaze Up At The Harvest Moon (2020)

Collaborations & Remixes 

 Acosta, EP (2017, with Kilchhofer)
 Bad Stream – Transition, Single (Hainbach Rework)
 Hainbach / Todd Barton, EP (2019, with Todd Barton)
 Borrowed Water, Album (2019, with My Panda Shall Fly)
 Hainbach / Morfbeats, Album (2020, with Morfbeats)
 George Hurd & Hurd Ensemble - Tethering Blind / All Falling Apart, Single (2020, Hainbach Remix)
 Jaybird, Single (2020, with Bad Stream)
 Wouter van Veldhoven – Wanderlied, Single (Hainbach Rework) (2021)

References

External links 

 Official Website 
 Hainbach YouTube Channel
 Hainbach discography at Discogs

Electronic musicians
Musicians from Freiburg im Breisgau
German male composers
1978 births
Living people